Nairobi Trio may refer to:

 The Nairobi Trio, a comedy routine popularized by Ernie Kovacs
 Nairobi Trio, a musical group led by Nigel Gavin